Pucaccocha (possibly from Quechua puka red, qucha lake, "red lake") is a mountain in the Andes of Peru, about  high It is located in the Cusco Region, Calca Province, Lares District. It lies in the eastern extensions of the Urubamba mountain range, northeast of Sahuasiray.

References 

Mountains of Peru
Mountains of Cusco Region